
Super Chief may refer to:

Transportation
 Super Chief, a Santa Fe Railway named passenger train
 Ford F-250 Super Chief concept truck
 The Aeronca 11CC "Super Chief" light aircraft.
 Super Chief, a model variant in the Pontiac Chieftain line of automobiles

Characters
 Super-Chief, a DC Comics character
 Cartoon character from The Funny Company

Media
 Super Chief, a Count Basie compilation LP
 Super Chief: The Life and Legacy of Earl Warren, a 1989 documentary film
 The Super Chief: Music For The Silver Screen, an album by Van Dyke Parks
 Superchief (film), a documentary film directed by Nick Kurzon

Other
 Nickname for former Major League Baseball pitcher Allie Reynolds
 A three-star bureau chief in the New York Police Department